Limnephilus parvulus is a species of northern caddisfly in the family Limnephilidae. It is found in North America.

References

Integripalpia
Articles created by Qbugbot
Insects described in 1905